Aung Hein Kyaw (born 19 July 1991) is a footballer from Burma, and a defender for Myanmar national football team and Myanmar U-22 football team. He played in 2013 AFC U-22 Asian Cup qualification.

He played for Zeyar Shwe Myay in Myanmar National League. In December 2015, he transferred to Ayeyawady United F.C.

References

1991 births
Living people
Burmese footballers
Myanmar international footballers
Ayeyawady United F.C. players
Association football defenders